The following is a partial list of rogue security software, most of which can be grouped into families.  These are functionally identical versions of the same program repackaged as successive new products by the same vendor.

 Windows Anti Breaking System
 ANG Antivirus a  
 AntiVermins
 Antivirus 360 – Clone of MS Antivirus.
 Antivirus 2008
 Antivirus 2009
 Antivirus 2010 – Clone of MS Antivirus. Also known as Anti-virus-1,
 AntiVirus Gold or AntivirusGT – Developed by ICommerce Solutions. Mimics the name of AVG Antivirus.
 Antivirus Master
 Antivirus Pro 2009
 Antivirus Pro 2010
 Antivirus Pro 2017
 Antivirus System PRO
 Antivirus XP 2008
 Antivirus XP 2010
 AV Antivirus Suite
 AVG Antivirus 2011 – Imitates AVG Antivirus and it is not affiliated with the legitimate AVG. Now discontinued.
 AV Security Essentials
 AV Security Suite
 Awola
 BestsellerAntivirus, Browser Defender
 ByteDefender also known as ByteDefender Security 2010 – Knock-off of the legitimate BitDefender Antivirus software
 Cleanator
 CleanThis
 Cloud Protection
 ContraVirus – Uses outated signature database. Discontinued.
 Control Center
 Cyber Security, Core Security
 Data Protection
 Defense Center – Discontinued.
 Defru
 Desktop Security 2017
 Disc Antivirus Professional
 Disk Doctor
 Doctor Antivirus
 Dr Guard
 DriveCleaner
 EasySpywareCleaner, EasyFix Tools
 Eco AntiVirus
 Errorsafe, Error Expert
 E-Set Antivirus 2011 – Also known as ESet Antivirus 2011. exploits name ESET (should not be confused with the legitimate app of the same name) 
 Essential Cleaner
 Flu Shot 4 – Probably the earliest well-known instance of rogue security software
 Green Antivirus 2009
 Hard Drive Diagnostic
 HDD Fix
 HDD Plus
 HDD Rescue
 Home Security Solutions
 IEDefender
 InfeStop
 Internet Antivirus, InstallShield (aka Internet Antivirus Pro, distributed by plus4scan.com)
 Internet Antivirus 2011
 Internet Defender 2011
 Internet Security 2010,
 Internet Security 2011
 Internet Security 2012
 Internet Security Essentials
 Internet Security Guard
 Live PC Care
 Live Security Platinum
 Live Security Suite
 Mac Defender
 Mac Protector
 MacSweeper
 MalwareAlarm
 MalwareCore
 MalwareCrush
 Malware Defense
 Malware Protection Center
 Memory Fixer
 MS AntiSpyware 2009 – Exploits the name of the legitimate Microsoft Antispyware, now Windows Defender. Discontinued.
 MS Antivirus – Also known as Microsoft Anti Malware Mimics the name of Microsoft Antivirus or Microsoft Security Essentials.
 MS Removal Tool
 Microsoft Security Essentials – Masquerades as the legitimate program. Now discontinued.
 My Security Engine
 My Security Shield
 My Security Wall
 MxOne Antivirus
 Netcom3 Cleaner
 Paladin Antivirus
 PAL Spyware Remover
 PC Antispy
 PC Clean Pro
 PC Privacy Cleaner
 PC Optimizer Pro 
 PCPrivacy Tools
 PCSecureSystem – Now discontinued.
 PerfectCleaner – Discontinued.
 Perfect Defender 2009, Perfect Optimizer
 PersonalAntiSpy Free
 Personal Antivirus
 Personal Internet Security 2011
 Personal Security
 Personal Shield Pro
 PC Antispyware
 PC Defender Antivirus
 PCKeeper
 Privacy Center
 SAntivirus
 Security Shield
 Security Solution 2011
 Security Suite Platinum
 Security Tool
 Security Tool
 Security Toolbar 7.1
 Security Essentials 2010 (not to be confused with Microsoft Security Essentials)
 Smartpcfixer
 Segurazo 
 SpyBouncer
 SpyContra
 SpyControl
 SpyCrush
 Spydawn – Discontinued.
 SpyEraser (Video demonstration)
 SpyGuarder
 SpyHeal (a.k.a. SpyHeals & VirusHeal)
 SpyLax – Previously known as SpyDoctor, masquerades as Spyware Doctor. Discontinued.
 Spylocked
 SpyMarshal
 SpyOfficer
 SpyRid
 SpyShelter
 SpySheriff (a.k.a. PestTrap, BraveSentry, SpyTrooper)
 SpySpotter
 SpywareBot – Imitates Spybot - Search & Destroy. Now discontinued.
 Spyware B1aster – Exploits the name of Javacool's SpywareBlaster and no trial version locatable online.
 Spyware Cleaner
 SpywareGuard 2008 – Mimics the name of SpywareGuard by Javacool Software
 SpywareNo – Clone of SpySheriff.
 Spyware Protect 2009
 SpywareQuake
 SpywareSheriff – Confused clone of SpySheriff.
 SpywareStop – Previous version was SpywareBot.
 Spyware Stormer, Spyware X-terminator
 SpywareStrike
 Spyware Striker Pro
 SpyWiper
 Super AV
 SysGuard
 Sysinternals Antivirus
 System Antivirus 2008
 Terminexor  Rogue clone of Spybot Search & Destroy and violates software's privacy policy or end user license agreement.
 TheSpyBot – Spybot - Search & Destroy knockoff
 ThinkPoint
 Total Secure 2009
 Total Secure 2009
 Total Win 7 Security
 Total Win Vista Security
 Total Win XP Security
 UltimateCleaner
 Ultra Defragger
 VirusHeat
 VirusIsolator
 Virus Locker
 VirusMelt
 VirusProtectPro (a.k.a. AntiVirGear)
 Vista Antivirus 2008
 Vista Home Security 2011
 Vista Internet Security 2012
 Vista Security 2011
 Vista Security 2012
 Vista Smart Security 2010
 VirusBurst
 VirusBursters
 VirusGuard
 Volcano Security Suite
 Win7 Antispyware 2011
 Win Antispyware Center
 Win 7 Home Security 2011
 WinAntiVirus Pro 2006
 WinFixer
 Win HDD
 WinHound
Winwebsec
 Windows Police Pro
 Winpc Antivirus
 Winpc Defender – Imitates Windows Defender. Now discontinued.
 WinSpywareProtect
 WinWeb Security 2008
 Wireshark Antivirus
 WorldAntiSpy
 Wolfram Antivirus
 XP AntiMalware
 XP AntiSpyware 2009
 XP AntiSpyware 2010
 XP AntiSpyware 2012
 XP Antivirus 2010
 XP Antivirus 2012
 XP Antivirus Pro 2010
 XP Defender Pro
 XP Home Security 2011
 XP Internet Security 2010
 Your PC Protector
Total Antivirus 2020
 GroffoAV

References 

Scareware
Social engineering (computer security)
Antivirus software